Lobatse Cricket Ground is cricket ground in Lobatse, Botswana. The ground is one of the three cricket grounds in the country.

The ground has hosted two ICC tournaments, first 2011 ICC World Cricket League Division Seven and then 2013 ICC World Cricket League Division Seven.

References

External links 

 Botswana Cricket Association Oval 2 cricketarchive
 cricinfo
 Official Website
 Wikimapia

Cricket grounds in Botswana
Sports venues in Botswana
Sport in Botswana